Ceint may refer to either:

 Kent in historical contexts, including
 The Kingdom of Kent
 Canterbury
 Afon Ceint, a tributary of the Cefni on Anglesey 
 Ceint, a small village in Llanddyfnan parish
 Ceint railway station, a station that served the area